Kin'unken (錦雲軒七宝焼 Kin'unken Shippōyaki) was a Japanese cloisonnéーmaking company located in Kyoto, Japan.

The company was given an imperial warrant of appointment to the Japanese court and was also patronized by the King of the Belgians.

Objects from Kin'unken are traded at auctions for high prices.

See also
 Ando Cloisonné Company

References

External links 
 https://ginza-shinseido.com/blog/2020/06/13/%E9%8C%A6%E9%9B%B2%E8%BB%92-%E8%8A%B1%E9%B3%A5%E7%B4%8B-%E8%8A%B1%E7%93%B6/

Belgian Royal Warrant holders
Japanese Imperial Warrant holders
Japanese brands
Manufacturing companies based in Kyoto
Vitreous enamel